S. V. Rajendra Singh Babu (born 22 October 1952) is an Indian filmmaker and occasional actor who works primarily in Kannada cinema. He was born and brought up in Mysore. His father Shankar Singh produced many films under the banner Mahatma Pictures (Mysore). Babu has written directed movies of different genres in Kannada and in Hindi that include love stories, war, suspense thrillers and comedy movies. Many of his films have been adapted from novels or short stories. Babu has won numerous awards for his films. His sister is producer and actress Vijayalakshmi Singh, and brother-in-law, actor Jai Jagadish.

Early life
Rajendra Singh Babu born in Mysore, Karnataka. His father, the late Shankar Singh, was a producer and director of Kannada films. His mother, Prathima Devi, was an actress in Kannada cinema. In an interview, Babu mentioned that his father wanted him to become a doctor, but his own passion for the camera propelled him to the film industry. Hailing from a family of movie makers, Babu was fascinated with films such as The Great Escape, Guns of Navarone and The Bridge on the River Kwai. He believes that cinema should go near the audience.

Filmography

Awards

National Film Awards

Karnataka State Film Awards

Filmfare Awards (South)

Books 
Rajendra Singh Babu wrote the book Nenanpina Muthina Hara in memory of the Kannada actor Vishnuvardhan. The book is a tribute to Vishnuvardhan, where Babu shares his numerous experiences with Vishnuvardhan, and describes Babu's drive to work on meaningful cinema.

Organizations / Committees

References

External links
 

20th-century Indian film directors
Writers from Mysore
Kannada film directors
Living people
Kannada screenwriters
Kannada film producers
Indian male screenwriters
Film directors from Bangalore
21st-century Indian film directors
Film producers from Bangalore
Recipients of the Rajyotsava Award 2005
1952 births